Hans Zeier (24 April 1899 – 11 August 1989) was a Swiss cross-country skier. He competed in the men's 50 kilometre event at the 1928 Winter Olympics.

References

External links
 

1899 births
1989 deaths
Swiss male cross-country skiers
Olympic cross-country skiers of Switzerland
Cross-country skiers at the 1928 Winter Olympics